Keweenawite is a discredited mineral species. It was described as an arsenide of copper, nickel, and cobalt containing 39% to 54% copper, 9.7% to 20% nickel, and 0.9% cobalt. Keweenawite was discovered in July 1901, in the Mohawk Mine, Keweenaw County, Michigan.  George A Koenig analyzed and named the copper ore.

History
Keweenawite was first discovered, in July 1901, located on the fifth level of the Mohawk Mine between Shaft No. 1 and Shaft No. 2. Fred Smith, mine superintendent, sent specimens to George A Koenig for analysis. Dr. Koenig deemed it to be a new mineral species and named it Keweenawite, after its discovery locality, Keweenaw County. 

However, a re-analysis of the material in 1971 found the keweenite to be a mixture of the copper and nickel arsenates: α-domeykite, niccolite and rammelsbergite.

See also
Mohawkite - Another discredited mineral species discovered in the Mohawk mine and analysed by George A Koenig

References

Minerals
Rocks
Geology of Michigan
Keweenaw County, Michigan